The 2013 Four Nations Tournament was the twelve edition of the Four Nations Tournament, an invitational women's football tournament held in China.

Participants

Venues

Final standings

Match results

References 

2013 in women's association football
2013
2013 in Chinese football
2013 in Canadian women's soccer
2013 in Norwegian women's football
2013 in South Korean football
January 2013 sports events in Asia
2013 in Chinese women's sport